Huang Cong may refer to:

 Huang Cong (footballer, born 1997) (黄聪), Chinese association footballer
 Huang Cong (footballer, born 2000) (黄聪), Chinese association footballer